The 1923 Mercer Baptists football team was an American football team that represented Mercer University as a member of the Southern Intercollegiate Athletic Association (SIAA) during the 1923 college football season. In their first year under head coach Stanley L. Robinson, the team compiled a 4–5 record. Robinson was hired from Mississippi College in March 1923 to replace Josh Cody who resigned to become an assistant coach at Vanderbilt.

Schedule

References

Mercer
Mercer Bears football seasons
Mercer Baptists football